Ghassan Alian (born 21 March 1972), is an Israeli-Druze officer in the IDF and the current head of the Coordinator of Government Activities in the Territories. Aluf by rank, he has previously served as Central Command's executive officer and head of the Israeli Civil Administration. Alian is one of the highest ranking Druze in the IDF and has served since 1990.

Biography
Ghassan Alian is from Shefa-'Amr. His wife, Shirin, works as a Hebrew teacher in a local school. They have three children.

Military career 
Alian was Chief Infantry and Paratroopers Officer and commanding officer of the Golani Brigade. He is the first non-Jewish commander of the brigade and the second Druze officer to command an Israel Defense Forces infantry brigade; the first was Imad Fares, commander of the Givati Brigade. 
Alian was previously the commander of the Duchifat Battalion, a reserve unit commander with the Alexandroni Brigade, and commander of the Menashe Territorial Brigade near Jenin in the West Bank. He had taken officer training at the same time as Naftali Bennett, Minister of the Economy, who praised Alian's selection as Golani Brigade commander by calling him "a brother". Prior to his appointment to the post of commander, Alian served as the brigade's deputy commander along with other appointments. In October 2013 Benny Gantz, the IDF's chief of staff, made the appointment.

Alian was wounded in a battle on 19 July 2014 during overnight clashes in the northern Gaza Strip as part of Operation Protective Edge. He was lightly injured in his eye, but his vision was not affected. He was evacuated to Soroka Hospital in Beersheba and while being treated he reportedly stated, "I have a lot of soldiers over there and I need to get back to them". He later returned to his soldiers after being treated.

On March 14th 2021 he was promoted to Aluf rank and on April 6th of the same year he began his role as the head of the Coordinator of Government Activities in the Territories

See also 
List of Israeli Druze

References 

People from Shefa-'Amr
Israeli Druze
Israeli soldiers
Living people
1972 births